A camper van, also referred to as a camper, caravanette, motor caravan or RV (recreational vehicle) in North America, is a self-propelled vehicle that provides both transport and sleeping accommodation. The term describes vans that have been fitted out, whereas a motorhome is one with a coachbuilt body.

Ambiguity with motorhome 

The term motorhome is sometimes used interchangeably with campervan, but the former can also be a larger vehicle than a campervan and intended to be more comfortable, whilst the latter is more concerned with ease of movement and lower cost. For example, some campervans lack built-in toilets and showers, or a divide between the living compartment and the cab.

The United States term "recreational vehicle" (RV) is more analogous to motorhome than campervan.

Features 

Campervans may be equipped either with a "pop-up" roof which is raised during camping, or a fixed roof, either shared with the commercial van that forms the basis of the vehicle (commonly a "high-top" model), or as part of a custom coach-built body.

Campervans usually have a small kitchen with a refrigerator (which is often powered by a choice of gas, battery, or mains electricity) and a two-burner gas hob and grill. They generally have dual-voltage lighting which can work from either a dedicated battery (other than the van battery) known as a deep-cycle or leisure battery, or from AC power, supplied at a campsite via a hook-up cable. Larger models may include a water heater, space heating and air conditioning, a portable toilet and an internal shower. Smaller models often carry a portable toilet, and sometimes an external shower that operates within the privacy of an awning.

The term "Dormobile" is sometimes used generically in the United Kingdom due to a once highly popular conversion brand, and "Kombi" is used in Australia and other countries. The popularity of this type expanded in the 1950s after Volkswagen commissioned the Westfalia company to use the Kombi version of their Type 2 transporter as the basis for a campervan.

Off-road variations 

Off-road campervans are often referred to as 4WD or 4x4 campers. Some models include expandable tents mounted on the roof while others have pop-up roofs for additional sleeping space and storage.

Pop-up roof variants share certain design elements with roof tents as sometimes fitted to more robust four wheel drive off-road vehicles intended for expeditions rather than relaxed camping. A compromise between these two purposes is sometimes reached by basing the conversion on an off-road vehicle. Sometimes the conversion is demountable from the back of a pick-up truck body.

Classic Volkswagen and other campervans 

There are several types of campervan manufactured by Volkswagen; depending on their age, they are colloquially referred to as either a splitty (split windscreen), a bay (bay framed windscreen), or a bricky ("brick" shaped van).

Although less popular, Mercedes also manufactured a similar-sized light van and conversions were reasonably common in the 1960s and 1970s. Of a similar size and vintage is the British Commer Spacevan conversion.

In Europe, the Citroën H-Van has also been used a base for many campervan conversions, and is popular amongst Dutch and Belgian users in particular. Ex-factory, it had several height and length configurations, and in all versions it had a low floor and high ceiling, a legacy of one of its original uses as a mobile shop. It does not usually need a pop-top to accommodate its users.

Modern mid-sized Japanese vans such as the Toyota Hiace are sometimes converted to have the appearance of a classic Volkswagen.

New concept car camper 

The car camper is an estate car(UK) or a station wagon (USA) converted into a travel home. The rear cargo area is converted into a full double bed area usually with a fabricated aluminium framework. All equipment necessary to set up a well-appointed camp site is stored under the double bed with access through lidded areas under the bed. Unlike a standard station wagon where the camping equipment has to be removed before sleeping or a tent set up, the car camper is self-contained.

British and European size and type classifications

A-class (AC) 

Similar to North American A-class recreational vehicles (sometimes known generically as "Winnebagos") but generally still smaller in Europe. Fully coachbuilt over a medium-to-large van chassis, from 7.5 tonnes and upwards. Highly appointed, sometimes with electrically operated slide-out (sideways) extensions to the living space, electricity-generating windmills and in very large models (of North American scale) sometimes even fitted with a hydraulically operated garage capable of transporting a small car.

Smaller (sub 7.5 tonnes) A class vehicles are also popular in Europe, similar in size to overcab coachbuilts, but without the base vehicle's cab. In its place, a (wider) cab is added, which allows for a drop-down bed to be fitted above. Recognisable by their large curved windscreens.

Overcab (OC) 

Coachbuilt body, retaining the base van's cab, with a raised Luton van style area over the cab containing a bed. Other beds may be fixed in place, built by moving seats and tables, or lowered from the ceiling. Shower and toilet cubicles usually fitted. Sometimes including a garage for bikes, and may be large enough to support a mechanism for towing a small city car. Roughly comparable to the North American C-class (CC).

Common base vehicles include the Fiat Ducato, Renault Master, and Ford Transit.

Low profile (LP) 

Coachbuilt but without a raised bed over the cab. Other beds may be fixed in place, built by moving seats and tables, or lowered from the ceiling.  Shower and toilet cubicles usually fitted. Garages and towing fittings may be carried as with the overcab designs.

Typical base vehicles are lighter-duty or smaller-engined variants of the same vehicles used for overcab designs.

High top (HT) 

Based on a high-top van, typically of around 2.8 to 4.5 tonnes gross vehicle weight, without major coachbuilding modifications to the body. Beds typically fixed in place or built by moving seats and tables. Shower and toilet cubicles sometimes fitted.

Typical base vehicles are the same as for the coachbuilt designs, above. Often, a Dodge, GMC or Ford van will be professionally converted into a high top.

Rising roof (RR) 

Often based on a relatively small van, typically 2 to 3 tonnes gross vehicle weight, including the classic Volkswagen Type 2, and with a roof which raises, usually with fabric sides, in a way not unlike a roof tent. Bed typically in the rising roof but also sometimes built by moving seats and tables. A rising roof is also sometimes used to allow for standing room in the vehicle. Shower and toilet cubicles rarely fitted.

The Volkswagen Transporter is a common base vehicle, and Ford Transits are also reasonably common.

Fixed roof (FR) 

Also known as "surf vans" (or "surf buses") and "day vans". Typically similar in size to the rising roof designs. Beds usually built by moving seats and tables. Shower and toilet cubicles very rarely fitted.

The Volkswagen Transporter and Mercedes-Benz Vito are particularly common base vehicles. They have become the successors to the classic Volkswagen Type 2. Slightly smaller vans such as the Fiat Scudo may be used; on occasion, even smaller vans such as the Fiat Doblò are used to make casual light-duty campers with minimal facilities beyond sleeping space.

Dismountable (DM) 

A coachbuilt body sits on a (sometimes modified) pick-up load-bed, and generally removable at campsites to allow the vehicle to be used.

Ford, Toyota, Nissan and Mitsubishi vehicles are common bases.

B-class (BC) 

This term is not commonly used except for imported North American models, which may vary greatly in size from semi-low profile coachbuilts to van conversions.  Typically, a van chassis is provided without interior or some exterior features as an "incomplete vehicle" by an automobile manufacturer, and upfitted with RV amenities by a coachbuilder. It is then sold as a completed RV and usually has safety standards certification from the RV Industry Association.

North American van conversions 

In North America there are many manufacturers of campervans. Since the 1970s, Japanese vans like the Toyota HiAce and the Datsun Urvan, as well as European models based on the Ford Transit, Fiat Ducato and Bedford vans, have become popular as base vehicles for conversions.

Amenities 
A modern campervan may contain some or all of the following features:
 Propane gas- or electric-powered refrigerator
 Propane gas or electric cooktop, grill, or both
 Microwave oven
 Oven
 Propane gas- or electric-powered water heater
 One or more beds, some of which double-up as daytime seating
 Electricity supplied by "house" battery or external hook-up
 Built-in or cassette toilet with removable disposal tank – a flushing toilet with access usually outside the campervan for easy emptying. Some models have a swivel system for extra space.
 Shower
 Television (with an aerial, satellite dish, or both)
 Air conditioning (at least the normal vehicle's cab system)
 Room heater or central heating
 Potable water tank
 Wastewater tank for "grey" (wash) water and black (sewer) water
 Extendable external awning – an extendable canvas shade which offers protection from the sun.
 Generator – powered by gasoline, diesel or propane
 Solar panels – for additional electricity generation
 Bike rack – a carrying device for bicycles, usually fixed to the rear of the campervan.

See also 

 Campervan hire agency
 Caravan park
 Conversion van
 Motorhome
 Recreational vehicle
 Travel trailer

References

External links 
 

Van
Portable buildings and shelters
Recreational vehicles
Vans